Costache Conachi (1777, Țigănești – 1849, Iași) was a Romanian writer noted for emphasizing reason and improving the craft of Romanian writing.

Biography 
Born as a member of the Conachi family, he was an affluent boyar from Moldavia.

Costache Conachi is regarded by some as the first true Romanian poet of his time. He is credited with infusing eroticism into Romanian poetry. Although he lived and worked in an era of Romanian literature that is hazy at best, his name is not easily forgotten.

Coming from a wealthy family Conachi had access to readings on foreign cultures and the works of great authors. This foundation of knowledge shaped his poems. It resulted in verses in Romanian marked with unprecedented elements such as eroticism.

See also
Conachi family
Cocuța Conachi

References

Boyars
1778 births
1849 deaths
Romanian poets
Romanian male poets
Conachi family
People from Munteni